Sergiu Ionuț Moga (born 7 January 1992) is a Romanian former footballer who played as a defender for clubs such as Budapest Honvéd, FC Voluntari, Luceafărul Oradea or Szeged-Csanád, among others.

Club statistics

Updated to games played as of 4 September 2013.

References

External links
 Budapest Honvéd FC profile

1992 births
Living people
Sportspeople from Oradea
Romanian footballers
Romania youth international footballers
Association football defenders
Budapest Honvéd FC players
Budapest Honvéd FC II players
FC Viitorul Constanța players
FC Voluntari players
CS Luceafărul Oradea players
Szeged-Csanád Grosics Akadémia footballers
Hajdúszoboszlói SE players
Liga I players
Liga II players
Nemzeti Bajnokság I players
Nemzeti Bajnokság II players
Nemzeti Bajnokság III players
Romanian expatriate footballers
Expatriate footballers in Hungary
Romanian expatriate sportspeople in Hungary